Rumpelstiltskin ("my-advisor-my-midget") is a Hebrew language-musical based on the Brother's Grimm Fairytale of the same name, written by Avraham Shlonsky. Shlonsky's rendition casts the story in a humoristic light, rather than the grim tone of the original. All monologues and dialogues are spoken in rhyme, and incorporate sophisticated wordplay using the Hebrew language at a high level alongside many inverted allusions to Jewish tradition, including one to the taboo over uttering the Tetragrammaton. Most notable of these allusions are those to the holiday of Purim and its connected piyutim, and to the bases of Hebrew grammar and pronunciation.

Casts

History
Rumpelstiltskin was first performed in the Cameri Theater in 1965, directed by Yossi Yizraeli, who adapted Shlonsky's original script of a non-musical play into a libretto for a musical.

References

Musicals based on short fiction
1965 musicals